Deoghar Junction railway station (station code DGHR) is the main railway station serving the city of Deoghar in Deoghar district, Jharkhand.

Further extension

The -long Jasidih–Hansdiha–Pirpainti line is under construction. As of March 2021, work is under progress on Mohanpur–Hansdiha and Godda–Pirpainti sections. Hansdiha–Godda section has been completed and a proposal for Humsafar Express from Godda to New Delhi is under consideration. This line is considered important to connect the Godda district in the Santhal Pargana division of Jharkhand with the rest of India. The  Godda–Pakur line is also planned

Facilities 
The major facilities available at Deoghar station are waiting rooms, computerised reservation facility, reservation counter and vehicle parking.

Platforms
There are a total of 3 platforms and 5 tracks. The platforms are connected by foot overbridge. These platforms are built to accumulate 24 coaches express train. The platforms are equipped with modern facility like display board of arrival and departure of trains.

Station layout

Major trains

Some of the important trains that runs from Deoghar are :

 Deoghar–Ranchi Intercity Express
 Ranchi–Dumka Intercity Express
 Deoghar–Agartala Weekly Express

Gallery

Track layout

See also

References

External links 

 Deoghar Junction Map

Railway stations in Deoghar district
Asansol railway division
Transport in Deoghar